Samuel D. Hunter (born 1981) is an American playwright living in New York City.

Hunter was born and raised in Moscow, Idaho. He is best known for plays A Bright New Boise, which won the 2011 Obie Award for playwriting, and The Whale, which won the 2013 Drama Desk Award and the 2013 Lucille Lortel Award for Outstanding Play. He is also the recipient of a 2014 MacArthur Fellowship. He has also been a guest lecturer at Rutgers University–New Brunswick, Fordham University, and other universities.

Hunter is also a writer and producer for the television show Baskets. A film adaptation of The Whale, written by Hunter and directed by Darren Aronofsky, was released in December 2022.

Produced plays 
 Five Genocides (2010)
 Jack's Precious Moment (2010)
 A Bright New Boise (2010)
 Norway (2011)
 A Permanent Image (2011)
 The Whale (2012)
 Pocatello (2014)
 The Few (2014)
 A Great Wilderness (2014)
 Rest (2014)
 Clarkston (2015)
 Lewiston (2016)
 The Healing (2016)
 The Harvest (2016)
 Lewiston/Clarkston (2018)
 Greater Clements (2019)
 A Case for the Existence of God (2022)

Awards and honors
2008–2009 Lark Play Development Center Playwrights of New York Fellowship
 2011 Drama Desk Nomination for Best Play
2011 Obie Award for Playwriting
 2012 Whiting Award
 2013 GLAAD Media Award for Outstanding New York Theatre (Broadway and Off-Broadway)
 2013 Drama Desk Special Award
 2013 Lucille Lortel Award for Best Play
 2014 MacArthur Fellowship
 2015 Honorary Doctorate in Humane Letters from the University of Idaho
 2019 Drama Desk Nomination for Best Play
 2020 Drama Desk Nomination for Best Play
2013–2020 Resident Playwright at New Dramatists

See also
 List of playwrights

Notes

External links
 Samuel D. Hunter's New Dramatists Page
Profile and Production History at The Whiting Foundation

1981 births
Living people
21st-century American dramatists and playwrights
People from Moscow, Idaho
American male dramatists and playwrights
21st-century American male writers
MacArthur Fellows
Writers from Idaho